Les Sorinières is a commune in the Loire-Atlantique department in western France.

It is the location of Villeneuve Abbey, where the tomb of Constance, Duchess of Brittany, her husband Guy of Thouars, and others can be found.

Population

See also
Communes of the Loire-Atlantique department

References

External links

 

Communes of Loire-Atlantique